Vinod Rathod (born 12 September 1962) is an Indian playback singer who primarily sings in Bollywood films. Rathod is the son of late classical musician, Pandit Chaturbhuj Rathod.

Music career

His career started when Usha Khanna after listening to his voice in a cassette called him in April 1986, to sing a qawwali, "Mere Dil Main Hai Andhera, Koi Shamma To Jala De" in Do Yaar. Mohammed Aziz was his co-singer. Vinod recorded no less than 40 songs for the composer, and also sang for composers like Ajay Swami and Surinder Kohli in his struggle phase. His TV serial title song, "Yeh Jeevan Hai Akash Ganga" for the serial Akash Ganga proved very successful amongst viewers.

He entered the big films league when composers Shiv-Hari called him to record "Baadal Pe Chalke Aa" with Lata Mangeshkar and Suresh Wadekar which proved popular and "Zindagi Har Janam Pyar Ki Dastan" with Lata Mangeshkar in Yash Chopra's Vijay in 1988 proved to be a greater success. Vinod was the voice of Rishi Kapoor in this multi-starer film. He then sang for Rishi-Yash-Shiv-Hari again in Chandni in 1989. This song, "Parbat Se Kaali Ghata Takrai" with Asha Bhosle also proved a hit along with "Sheharon Mein Ek Shehar Suna" with Lata Mangeshkar.

However, he got his real break in 1992 when Laxmikant–Pyarelal offered him "Romeo Naam Mera" for Roop Ki Rani Choron Ka Raja. It has proven to be one of the biggest hit of 1992. Laxmikant-Pyarelal rapidly called him for more films, which instilled confidence for Vinod among the other composers like Anu Malik, Bappi Lahiri and Anand–Milind. As luck would have it, Nadeem-Shravan (Shravan is Vinod's elder brother) were at the crest of popularity, and though Nadeem favoured Kumar Sanu he gave Vinod Rathod the onus of being the voice of Shah Rukh Khan in Deewana. "Aisi Deewangi" with Alka Yagnik proved a rage and "Koi Na Koi Chahiye Pyar Karne Wala" too proved popular. This film was also released in 1992.

By 1993, Vinod Rathod was a very busy man. Laxmikant-Pyarelal gave him excellent songs in several films like Bedardi, Dilbar and many other films, and decided that he would be the major voice of Rishi Kapoor in the R K film Prem Granth. Their hits with him included "Jab Se Main Jara Sa Badnam Ho Gaya' – Gumrah and "Nayak Nahin Khalnayak Hoon Main" – Khal-Nayak. Anu Malik swept aside Nadeem-Shravan by late 1993–94 and Vinod Rathod was very much there in hits like "Ae Mere Humsafar", "Kitabein Bahut Si", "Samajhkar Chand Jisko" and "Chupana Bhi Nahin Aata' – Baazigar. Followed Ladla, Elaan, Agnisakshi, Muhabbat Ki Arzoo, Chahoonga Main Tujhe, Gambler, Parampara, The Gentleman, Zamana Deewana, Shreemaan Aashique, Maidan-E-Jung, Policewala Gunda, Hum Sab Chor Hain, Chaahat, Vastav and the hits "Duniya Ye Duniya Very Good Very Good" – Trimurti and "Dil Dene Ki Rut Aayi" – Prem Granth.
Anand–Milind made him the voice of Govinda in films like Raja Babu, Rajaji, Hero No. 1, Dulhe Raja, Ankhiyon Se Goli Maare and Banarsi Babu. He also sang the popular Main to hoon paagal munda for Shahrukh Khan in 1996 in the film Army.

Vinod had a triumph of sorts in the Zee Telefilm, Mr. Shrimati, in which he sang "Aashiq Ki Hai Baraat". His other hits include his songs from Deewana Mastana, Army, Hero No. 1 and Dulhe Raja, Tere Mere Sapne, and his latest chartbuster, "Dholi Taro Dhol Baje" – Hum Dil De Chuke Sanam, "Chalak Chalak" – Devdas, "M Bole To" – Munna Bhai MBBS which has given his career a new boost after 1999. His songs from Chal Mere Bhai have proved popular too.

“Main Hoon Number Ek Gawaiya" from Saajan Chale Sasural proved his classical excellence which he has incorporated from his father.

Not only a huge list of production houses Vinod has sung more than 3500 songs in various languages such as Hindi, Nepali, English, Gujarati, Marathi, Sindhi, Punjabi, Bengali, Oriya, Tamil, Kannada, Telugu, Rajasthani, Bhojpuri and Persian. 

Vinod Rathod has received nominations for Filmfare Award for Best Male Playback Singer in 1993: Aisi Deewangi (Deewana) and 1994: Nayak Nahin Kahlnayak Hoon Main (Khalnayak)

He is the uncle of music composers Sanjeev-Darshan, brother of music composer/singer Roop Kumar Rathod and music director Shravan Rathod.

Discography
He entered the big films league in 1988 and he had received two times nomination for Filmfare Award for Best Male Playback Singer for his best performance in "Aisi Deewangi" from Deewana and "Nayak Nahin Kahlnayak Hoon Main" from Khalnayak. He has sung for all the leading composers and his most popular co-singers were Sadhana Sargam, Anuradha Paudwal, Asha Bhosle, Lata Mangeshkar, Alka Yagnik, Poornima and Kavita Krishnamurthy.

References
2. Vinod Rathore explained by filmsleague

External links
 

Living people
Indian male singers
Rajasthani people
1962 births